The Japanese Chin, also known as the Japanese Spaniel, is a toy dog breed, being both a lap dog and a companion dog, with a distinctive heritage.

History

While most believe that the source breed for the Japanese Chin originated in China, the route by which the Chin arrived in Japan is a widely debated topic. One story claims that the dogs were given to the Japanese royalty in AD 732 as gifts brought by Kim Jangson, an envoy from the kingdom of Silla on the Korean peninsula. Others maintain that they were given as gifts to the Empress of Japan as early as the middle of the sixth century or by the seventh century. Still others claim that the Chin first arrived in Japan around the year AD 1000.

In 1613, the Japanese Chin was brought to England. In 1853 one was acquired by American naval officer, Matthew Calbraith Perry. Since 1868 they have been lap dogs to ladies of the upper class and today are companion dogs.

Appearance 

The American Kennel Club and the Fédération Cynologique Internationale give no weight requirement for the Chin, regardless of the aforementioned desire for lighter dogs. Its distinctive expression is characterized by a large rounded broad head, large wide-set dark eyes, a very short broad muzzle, ear feathering, and evenly patterned facial markings.

Coat and color
Japanese Chin are very cat-like in both appearance and traits.
Most dogs have two types of hair in their coat: an under and over coat.  However, the Japanese Chin only has an over coat.  An adult coat can take up to two years to completely grow in and can be either black and white, red and white (including all shades of sable, lemon, or orange), or tricolour (black and white with reddish tan points) As of 11 November 2011, the colors not listed in the breed standard are grounds for disqualification in competitions.

The dogs have a dot or a line on their forehead, which is believed in Japanese history to be the touch of Buddha. The dog is known for its strabismus of the eyes.

Temperament
This breed is considered one of the most cat-like of the dog breeds in attitude: it is alert, intelligent, and independent, and it uses its paws to wash and wipe its face. Other cat-like traits include their preference for resting on high surfaces, their good sense of balance, and their tendency to hide in unexpected places. Japanese Chin are loyal to their owners and are typically a friendly breed.  While Japanese Chin prefer familiar surroundings, they also do well in new situations. This, alongside their friendly demeanor, makes them good therapy dogs. Early socialization of Japanese Chin puppies leads to a more emotionally well-balanced Chin that is more accepting of different situations and people.

Japanese Chin are defensive animals and thus although they are usually quiet, they will bark to alert the arrival of a visitor or to draw attention to something out of the ordinary.

Japanese Chin were also bred for the purpose of entertaining their owners. While typically calm, they are well known for performing many tricks such as the "Chin Spin", in which they turn around in rapid circles; dancing on their hind legs while pawing their front feet, clasped together, in the air; and some even "sing", a noise that can range from a low trill to a higher, almost operatic noise.

Health
Common health issues in the Japanese Chin include luxating patellas (slipping kneecaps), cataracts, and early-onset heart murmurs. The Chin, as with most small breed dogs, can also have a risk of hypoglycemia when aged under six months or weighing four to five lbs or less. Some Japanese Chin have seasonal allergies.

The Japanese Chin's flattened brachycephalic face can lead to breathing and eye problems. Temperature extremes (particularly heat) should therefore be avoided. Its oversized eyes are easily scratched and corneal scratches or more serious ulcerations can result.  Mild scratches benefit from topical canine antibacterial ointment specifically for eye application; more serious injury or ulcerations require urgent medical care.

The Japanese Chin Club of America estimates Chins have a typical lifespan of 12-14 years, with some living to 15 or more. A UK Kennel Club survey puts their median lifespan at 9.25 years.

Care
The Japanese Chin's coat requires weekly brushing or combing, with special attention being given to the skirt and the area under the ears and legs. They do not require frequent bathing. These dogs are single-coated and single-hair shedders, and it is very seldom one will find a Chin with an undercoat. A Japanese Chin will have a light blowing of their coat once a year. Without fiber in the diet, they may need to have their anal glands expressed due to them becoming impacted. The skin folds in and around the nose and flattened facial area of a Japanese Chin can trap moisture from its oversized eyes and cause fungal problems. The face should be occasionally wiped with a damp cloth and the folds cleaned with a cotton swab, in addition the breed requires between 16 and 18 hours of sleep a day.

Diet is an important factor in the health and condition of the Japanese Chin, with many of these dogs being very sensitive or allergic to corn. Maintaining a Japanese Chin on a high quality kibble that contains no corn will prevent skin and allergy conditions.

See also
 Dogs portal
 List of dog breeds
 Companion Group
 Toy Group

References

External links

 

Companion dogs
Dog breeds originating in Japan
FCI breeds
Spaniels